RWE Vertrieb AG v Verbraucherzentrale Nordrhein-Westfalen eV (2013) C-92/11 is an EU law and consumer protection case, concerning the Unfair Terms in Consumer Contracts Directive. It emphasises the foundations of consumer protection on inequality of bargaining power and imbalances in information.

Facts
RWE Vertrieb AG supplied natural gas in 'special' contracts, and 'standard' contracts to consumers. The tariffs were partly set by national law. Tariff changes were regulated for 'standard' contracts, but not special contracts. The gas company could vary prices unilaterally without stating reasons, conditions or the scope of variation. The legislation merely required consumers were informed of the variation, and allowed them to terminate if they did not accept. RWE increased gas prices four times between July 2003 and October 2005, and customers in fact had no possibility to change gas supplier. The Verbraucherzentrale NRW eV (the Consumer Centre for North Rhine-Westphalia) claimed a reimbursement for the price increases.

Judgment

Bundesgerichtshof
The German Bundesgerichtshof allowed the claim, and RWE's appeals were unsuccessful. RWE asked for the ECJ to determine (1) whether Directive 93/13 art 1(2), which precludes application to mandatory or statutory regulatory provisions, meant there could be no application to general terms and conditions in contracts which reproduced a national law. It also asked if (2) national law was precluded by art 3 (non-individually negotiated terms are unfair if imbalanced and lacking good faith) and art 5 (terms must be in plain, intelligible language), in conjunction with Annex A, point 1(j) and 2(b), and art 3(3) of Directive 2003/55.

The German government argued there would be serious financial consequences for German gas supply contracts.

European Court of Justice
The ECJ held that the system of consumer protection was based on the idea that the consumer was in a weaker position. The German legislature had deliberately decided to not apply national law to special contracts. The financial consequences for gas suppliers could not be deduced simply by how the law might be interpreted.

See also

EU law

Notes

References

Court of Justice of the European Union case law
Contract case law
German case law
2013 in case law
2013 in Germany